Harold Marion Crothers (born 1887) was an American professor of electrical engineering at South Dakota State University where he also served as president for three periods (1946, 1951, 1957–58).
He was dean of Engineering 1925-55 and gave name to the Crothers Engineering Hall (1957). Earlier, he was instrumental in the establishment of the university's first radio station (1931).

Crothers received a B.S. in mathematics (1910) and did a study on Potential Distribution on High Tension Insulators with advisor Jesse L. Brenneman (1913).
This led to a Ph.D. at University of Wisconsin, Madison on a thesis entitled The Selective Properties of Coupled Radio Circuits advised by with Edward Bennett (physicist) (1920).  He joined the faculty there and wrote a book on Introductory Electrodynamics, jointly with Bennett (1926).

References

American engineers
1887 births
University of Wisconsin–Madison College of Engineering alumni
University of Wisconsin–Madison faculty
South Dakota State University faculty
Year of death missing